Ishani Senanayake (born 13 August 1995) is a Sri Lankan swimmer. She competed in the women's 200 metre freestyle event at the 2017 World Aquatics Championships.

References

1995 births
Living people
Sri Lankan female swimmers
Place of birth missing (living people)
Sri Lankan female freestyle swimmers
South Asian Games silver medalists for Sri Lanka
South Asian Games bronze medalists for Sri Lanka
South Asian Games medalists in swimming